Da Jammies is an animated musical television series that first aired on August 31, 2015, on Netflix. It was created by Aulsondro "Novelist" Hamilton and William "Dolla" Chapman II. The series covers various issues that affect children with an overarching theme of "unity" and "doing it together".

Ralph Farquhar is the executive producer. It is directed by Tyree Dillihay and Ron Myrick. Featured guest stars include Darius McCrary, Alisa Reyes, Dani Nicolet, Kurtis Blow, Buddy Lewis, Emcee N.I.C.E., William "Dolla" Chapman II aka D.B.I., Tiny Lister Jr., Kel Mitchell and James Avery.

Premise 
Da Jammies centers around a group of friends who attend a performing arts school where they struggle to balance real-life issues with their dreams of stardom. Co-leader Dolla (William "Dolla" Chapman II) is a quick-tempered, rapping dancer who believes that Da Jammies do not practice enough. The other co-leader, Novelist (Aulsondro "Novelist" Hamilton), plays a "peacekeeping" role and always has a solution to help the crew succeed. The other members are Momo (Alisa Reyes), a poet with a bubbly personality; LaLa (Dani Nicolet), a singing diva; and Seven (Anderson Johnson Jr.), a "soulful crooner" who always tries to be helpful. Their nemesis is another group called the Battlebrats, whose leaders Mike Fresh (Kel Mitchell) and Smalls (Shane Tsurugi) constantly seek ways to outdo Da Jammies and usually fail.

In each episode, the show addresses issues that affect young people, such as homelessness, bullying, self-awareness, body image, and friendship.

Cast and characters

Principal cast

Secondary cast 
Einny (voiced by Shane Tsurugi) - Resident Genius

Einny is not only the resident genius with an IQ of 300, but he is the king of gadgets. He chose to forego college, telling his mother and father he knows he's smart but that he wants to grow up like a normal kid. He befriended Da Jammies and started inventing things like rockets, time-traveling machines, and space ships.
 Principal Cransberry (voiced by Darius McCrary) The Musical Has Been
Cransberry is an extremely short, money-hungry principal who exploits the students' talents for his own benefit. A former R&B singer who never made it past his first record, he knows the kids can make money, and does all he can to profit off them. This includes taking a portion of all proceeds that Da Jammies and others make while performing at the school.
 Klondell (voiced by Buddy Lewis) All World Security Guard

Klondell is a security guard at the school and the local mall. He acts as a resident uncle to the students but sees the kids as beyond stupid with their reliance on gadgets and technology. He wants things to be as they used to be.

Da Jammies Nemesis

The Battlebrats 
 Mike Fresh (voiced by Kel Mitchell) Non-talented hothead
Mike Fresh comes from an affluent family that allows him to get whatever he wants. He wants to rap but is not good at it, and is jealous of Dolla. He does whatever he pleases. Part of his everyday routine is coming up with ways to sabotage Dolla; which includes Da Jammies.

 Smalls (voiced by Shane Tsurugi) The Rapping Japanese
Smalls is equally spoiled by his affluent family. He loves to rap sometimes in Japanese and English. His dad is a well-to-do music executive who doesn't know his son is amazing. Mike Fresh and Smalls are best friends who constantly endanger themselves.

Additional characters 
 Covington - James Avery 
 Big Horace - Tommy 'Tiny' Lister, Jr. 
 Shamus - Marcus T. Paulk
 Kurtis Flow - Kurtis Blow 
 Crazy Craze - James "JJ" Lewis
 Lady Lark - Rebecca Shoichet
 Angelique - Kyla Pratt
 Love Man - Rodney Perry
 The Magician - Dorien Wilson
 8's Mother - Kym Whitley
 Substitute Teacher - May May Ali
 Little Horace - Jamal McCants
 Irish/Jamaican/Pretty Girl - Malia Dawkins 
 LaLa's Mother - Rena Andrews 
 Nurse Kelly - Riccarda Lacey
 Novelist's Mother - Sophia Santi 
 Big Daddy Candy Cane - Ulysses Braxton
 Motor City J – Taylor Boggan

Casting 
Image Award winner Eileen Mack Knight was in charge of casting for Da Jammies; her notable shows are The Proud Family, Just Jordan, The Bernie Mac Show, Martin, Wendy Wu and more.

Episodes

Reception 
Da Jammies received mixed but favorable reviews upon its debut. Forbes magazine called it "Fame" meets "Josie and The Pussycats". Soul Train deemed it a "First of its kind 3D animated series that combines hip-hop music, dance and fashion". The show received 3 out of 5 stars on Common Sense Media.

As of 2016, Da Jammies was streaming in 14 countries on Netflix: Australia, Bangladesh, Canada,  India, Ireland, Luxembourg, New Zealand, Pakistan, Philippines, Russia, South Africa, Thailand, UK and USA.

As of 2021, Da Jammies was no longer available on Netflix.

References

External links
 
 
 https://www.netflix.com/title/80067487

2015 American television series debuts
2010s American animated television series
2010s American black cartoons
2015 Canadian television series debuts
2010s Canadian animated television series
2010s Canadian black cartoons
American children's animated comedy television series
American children's animated musical television series
American computer-animated television series
Canadian children's animated comedy television series
Canadian children's animated musical television series
Canadian computer-animated television series
English-language Netflix original programming
Hip hop television
Netflix children's programming
Television shows set in California
Animated television series about children
Animated television series about families